John Aspinall (born 15 March 1959) is an English former footballer who played as a winger for Tranmere Rovers, Altrincham and Bangor City. He made 139 appearances for Tranmere, scoring 30 goals.

References

1959 births
Living people
Sportspeople from Birkenhead
Association football wingers
English footballers
Cammell Laird 1907 F.C. players
Tranmere Rovers F.C. players
Altrincham F.C. players
Bangor City F.C. players
English Football League players
English football managers
Bangor City F.C. managers